The Oreille River is a tributary of the Blondeau River (Chibougamau Lake), flowing entirely in the town of Chibougamau, in Jamésie, in the administrative region of Nord-du-Québec, in the province of Quebec, in Canada.

The course of the river flows entirely in the canton of Roy.

The hydrographic slope of the "Oreille River" is accessible by the junction of a forest road (East-West direction) serving the north side of Chibougamau Lake; the latter is connected to route 167 which also serves the south side of Waconichi Lake and the Waconichi River. This last road comes from Chibougamau, going north-east to the south-eastern part of Mistassini Lake.

The surface of the "Oreille River" is usually frozen from early November to mid-May, however, safe ice circulation is generally from mid-November to mid-April.

Geography

Toponymy 
The term "Oreille" is a family name of French origin.

The toponym "rivière Oreille" was formalized on December 5, 1968, at the Commission de toponymie du Québec, at the foundation of this commission.

References

See also 

Rivers of Nord-du-Québec
Nottaway River drainage basin
Eeyou Istchee James Bay